Gerald Liddlelow (died 15 February 1983) was a Trinidadian cricketer. He played in three first-class matches for Trinidad and Tobago from 1910 to 1929.

See also
 List of Trinidadian representative cricketers

References

External links
 

Year of birth missing
1983 deaths
Trinidad and Tobago cricketers
Marylebone Cricket Club cricketers